The Ionian Adriatic Pipeline (IAP) is a proposed natural gas pipeline in Southeast Europe. It would run from Fier in Albania through Montenegro, and Bosnia and Herzegovina, to Split in Croatia.

In Fier, IAP would be connected with the Trans Adriatic Pipeline. Trans Adriatic Pipeline AG has signed memorandums of understanding with developers of the IAP project, including Plinacro (Croatia), BH-Gas (Bosnia and Herzegovina), and governments of Montenegro and Albania.

In Split, the pipeline would be connected with the existing gas transmission system of Croatia. In addition, it may be connected with other new gas infrastructure, including the Krk LNG terminal in Krk.

The length of pipeline would be .  The pipeline would be bi-directional and its capacity would be  of natural gas per year.

The ministerial declaration on the IAP project was signed on 25 September 2007 in the framework of the Energy Community.

See also

New European Transmission System
 Adriatic–Ionian motorway

References

Natural gas pipelines in Albania
Natural gas pipelines in Montenegro
Natural gas pipelines in Bosnia and Herzegovina
Natural gas pipelines in Croatia
Proposed pipelines in Europe
Albania–Croatia relations
Albania–Bosnia and Herzegovina relations
Albania–Montenegro relations
Bosnia and Herzegovina–Croatia relations
Bosnia and Herzegovina–Montenegro relations
Croatia–Montenegro relations